The Feindstrafrecht (German for "Criminal Law of the Enemy") is a criminal law and civil rights concept outlined in 1985 by the German criminal law professor and legal philosopher Günther Jakobs. The Feindstrafrecht says that certain people, as enemies of the society (or the state), do not deserve the protections of the civil or penal law. The Feindstrafrecht allows every available means to pursue and punish those enemies.

It is worth pointing out that the Feindstrafrecht is not a law. Most notably, it means the suspension of certain laws in order to protect the society or the state from certain dangers. Jakobs writings propose the term "Criminal Law of the Citizen" ("Bürgerstrafrecht") as the counterpart of the "Criminal Law of the Enemy". The concept of the Feindstrafrecht is opposed by most scholars of penal law and legal philosophy alike. Günther Jakobs points out that he was merely describing the existing Feindstrafrecht, while critics say that he took an affirmative position in his 2004 publication.

In the latter publication, Jakobs proposes that anybody who does not respect the laws and the legal order of a state - or even wants to destroy them - should lose all rights as a citizen and as a human being, and the state should be allowed to persecute him or her with all available means. This means that a terrorist who wants to subvert the societal norms, a criminal who ignores all laws, or a mafia member who only respects the rules of his clan should be designated as "unpersons" and not deserve to be treated as a citizen anymore. Rather, such people must be treated as enemies.

Jakobs justifies the necessity of a Feindstrafrecht philosophically, and refers to the Hobbesian social contract theory and its interpretation by Immanuel Kant. Whoever terminates that social contract by dishonoring it, leaves society and enters the lawless natural state. Thereby, he loses his rights as a person and turns into an enemy, and as such, he has to be persecuted by the society.

Current events 
Although the Feindstrafrecht has been applied back by the Germanic peoples and in the Medieval Ages, the German Nazi era was notorious for it. Beggars, disabled people, Jews, trade union members and other persons were designated "Volksschädlinge" ("vermin of the people"), and thus imprisoned at will by the Gestapo, and quickly condemned by the Volksgerichtshof.

In Colombia, since 1990 a kind of Feindstrafrecht is applied against drug dealers. The accused are imprisoned without accusation, often for years, and held without access to a lawyer. The accused are then often tried based on anonymous witness evidence.

The designation of Al Qaida terrorists and Taliban fighters as "unlawful combatant" and their imprisonment at Guantanamo Bay Naval Base is also likened to the Feindstrafrecht concept, as are the targeted killings by drones of the U.S. Air Force.

Criticism 
Criticism is leveled by several law scholars, for example because the Feindstrafrecht in itself is not a law, but intends to disable existing laws in order to deprive people of legal protections. The German Basic law also stipulates that human dignity of all people has to be protected by the German government, not only the dignity of those who respect the law. The social philosopher Oskar Negt, in his 2010 work "Der politische Mensch - Demokratie als Lebensform", summarizes some other criticism.

Literature 
 Günther Jakobs: Kriminalisierung im Vorfeld einer Rechtsgutsverletzung. Zeitschrift für die gesamte Strafrechtswissenschaft 97, 1985, pages 751–785.
 Günther Jakobs: Bürgerstrafrecht und Feindstrafrecht. HRRS 3/2004, S. 88–95.

Emergency laws in Germany
Philosophy of law